Zaporizhzhia or Zaporizhia is a city in Ukraine.

Zaporizhzhia, Zaporozhzhia, or Zaporozhye may also refer to:

Places in Ukraine 
 Zaporizhzhia (region), a historical region in central east Ukraine below the Dnieper river rapids
 Zaporizhzhia Governorate, (1920–22) Ukrainian SSR, Soviet Union
 Zaporizhzhia Oblast (1939–), a first-level administrative unit in Ukraine
 Zaporizhzhia Raion, an administrative unit of Zaporizhzhia Oblast
 Nove Zaporizhzhia, Zaporizhzhia Raion, a village in Zaporizhzhia Raion
 Zaporizhzhia, city and administrative centre of Zaporizhzhia Oblast and Zaporizhzhia Raion

Facilities and structures 
 Zaporizhzhia International Airport, Zaporizhzhia, Ukraine
 Zaporizhzhia Nuclear Power Plant, Enerhodar, Ukraine
 Zaporizhzhia thermal power station, Enerhodar, Ukraine

Other 
 Ukrainian submarine Zaporizhzhia

See also 

 
 
 Zaporozhsky (disambiguation)
 ZAZ Zaporozhets